Pat McGinnis may refer to:
 W. Patrick McGinnis, former CEO of Purina
 Pat Maginnis, abortion activist (misspelling)